Photo-reflectance is an optical technique for investigating the material and electronic properties of thin films. Photo-reflectance measures the change in reflectivity of a sample in response to the application of an amplitude modulated light beam. In general, a photo-reflectometer consists of an intensity modulated "pump" light beam used to modulate the reflectivity of the sample, a second "probe" light beam used to measure the reflectance of the sample, an optical system for directing the pump and probe beams to the sample, and for directing the reflected probe light onto a photodetector, and a signal processor to record the differential reflectance.  The pump light is typically modulated at a known frequency so that a lock-in amplifier may be used to suppress unwanted noise, resulting in the ability to detect reflectance changes at the ppm level.

The utility of photo-reflectance for characterization of semiconductor samples has been recognized since the late 1960s. In particular, 
conventional photo-reflectance is closely related to electroreflectance in that the sample's internal electric field is modulated by the photo-injection of electron-hole pairs. The electro-reflectance response is sharply peaked near semiconductor interband transitions, which accounts for its usefulness in semiconductor characterization.  Photo-reflectance spectroscopy has been used to determine semiconductor bandstructures, internal electric fields, and other material properties such as crystallinity, composition, physical strain, and doping concentration.

Etymology
The name "photo-reflectance" or "photoreflectance" is shortened from the term "photo-modulated reflectance," which describes the use of an intensity modulated light beam to perturb the reflectance of a sample. The technique has also been referred to as "modulated photo-reflectance," "modulated optical reflectance," and "photo-modulated optical reflectance." It has been known at least since 1967.

Basic principles
Photo-reflectance is a particularly convenient type of modulation spectroscopy, as it may be performed at room temperature and only requires the sample have a reflecting surface.  It is an established tool for non-contact determination of material and electronic properties of semiconductor films. In photo-reflectance, a pump laser beam is used to modulate the free charge density in a semiconductor sample (via photo-injection), thereby modulating one or more physical quantities (e.g. the internal electric field).  The measured signal ΔR is the change in amplitude of the reflected probe light as the intensity modulated pump radiation interacts with the sample.  The normalized signal is ΔR/R, i.e. the pump-induced change in reflectance (AC) divided by the baseline reflectance (DC). The conventional photo-reflectance apparatus uses a spectroscopic source for the probe beam, such that the signal may be recorded as a function of the probe light's wavelength. Generally, the signal may be written:
 
where ΔR/R is the normalized change in reflectance, α (≡1/R×∂R/∂ε1) and β (≡1/R×∂R/∂ε2) are the "Seraphin coefficients" which contain filmstack information, and Δε1 and Δε2 are the pump induced changes in the complex dielectric function. However, in conventional photo-reflectance analysis, it is not necessary to independently determine the refractive and absorptive components (the first and second terms in ΔR/R, respectively) of the signal. Rather, a fit to the overall signal is performed using the third derivative functional form given by Aspnes. This fit procedure yields the interband transition energies, amplitudes, and widths. However, because the signal depends on the uniformity of the perturbation, the extraction of such parameters must be treated with care.

Experimental setup
The conventional photo-reflectance experimental setup uses a xenon or tungsten based lamp source passed through a monochromator to form the incident probe beam.  The pump beam may be formed by the output of a continuous wave (CW) laser (e.g. a He-Ne or He-Cd laser) passed through a chopper wheel, or may be formed by the output of a directly modulated semiconductor diode laser. The pump beam is focused to a spot on the sample where it interacts with the sample. The probe beam is co-focused onto the sample where it is reflected.  The reflected probe beam is collected and passed through an optical filter to eliminate any unwanted pump light and/or photoluminescence signal.  Thereafter the probe beam is directed onto a photodetector (e.g. a Si or InGaAs photodiode), which converts the probe intensity to an electrical signal. The electrical signal is processed to eliminate unwanted noise, typically using a lock-in circuit referenced to the modulation frequency.  The photo-reflectance signal is then recorded as a function of probe beam wavelength using a computer or the like.

Experimental considerations
In photo-reflectance, the sample's internal electric field is modulated by the photo-injection of electron-hole pairs (thus reducing the latent field). In order to achieve photo-injection, the energy of photons in the pump beam must exceed the band gap of material within the sample.  Furthermore, semiconductors with little or no electric field will exhibit little or no electro-reflectance response. While this situation is not common, this point makes clear the importance of maintaining the probe intensity at a minimum, since any photo-injection of electron-hole pairs from the probe will necessarily offset the sample baseline condition by reducing the latent field.  (Likewise, any CW component of the pump is undesirable.) Conversely, if the probe intensity is too low, detection may not be possible with conventional photodiodes. A further consideration is that phase-locked detection is a practical necessity due to the small size of the experimental signals (~ppm) and the unique ability of phase-locked detection methods to reject noise outside a narrow bandwidth centered on the modulation frequency.

Applications
Photo-reflectance is a highly sensitive measurement technique and provides unmatched capability for characterizing the material and electronic properties of thin films. Photo-reflectance has been particularly important in basic research on semiconductors due to its ability to precisely determine semiconductor bandstructures (even at room temperature). As an optical technique, photo-reflectance would appear suited to industrial applications because it is non-contact, and because it has good spatial resolution. However, the need for spectroscopic information limits measurement speed, and consequently the adoption of spectroscopic photo-reflectance in industrial applications such as process control of microelectronics manufacturing.

Nevertheless, where spectroscopic information is not required, photo-reflectance techniques have been implemented in semiconductor manufacturing process control.  For example, in the late 1980s, Therma-Wave, Inc. introduced the "Therma-Probe" photo-modulated reflectance system to the market for semiconductor process control equipment. The original Therma-Probe focused an intensity modulated pump laser beam onto a spot on a silicon sample, modulating the sample reflectance. The reflectance changes were detected by a coincident laser probe beam of 633 nanometer wavelength. At this wavelength no electro-reflectance signal is present, since it is far removed from any interband transitions in silicon. Rather, the mechanisms responsible for the Therma-Probe signal are thermo-modulation and the Drude free carrier effect. The Therma-Probe was used primarily for monitoring of the ion implantation process in silicon semiconductor manufacturing. Measurement systems such as the Therma-Probe are particularly desirable in process control of microelectronics manufacturing because they provide the ability to quickly verify the correct execution of process steps, without contacting the wafer or removing the wafer from the clean room. Generally a number of measurements will be made on certain areas of the wafer and compared with expected values. As long as the measured values are within a certain range, the wafers are passed for continued processing. (This is known as statistical process control.) Other photo-modulated reflectance systems marketed for process control of implant processes are the "TWIN" metrology system marketed by PVA TePla AG, and the "PMR-3000" marketed by Semilab Co. Ltd (originally Boxer-Cross, Inc.).

However, by the mid 2000s, new manufacturing processes were requiring new process control capabilities, for example the need for control of new "diffusion-less" annealing processes and advanced strained silicon processes.  To address these new process control requirements, in 2007, Xitronix Corporation introduced a photo-reflectance system to the semiconductor process control market.  Like the Therma-Probe, the Xitronix metrology system utilized a fixed wavelength probe beam generated by a laser.  However, the probe beam of the Xitronix system had a wavelength of approximately 375 nanometers, near the first major interband transition in silicon.  At this wavelength the electro-modulation signal is dominant, which enabled the Xitronix system to precisely measure active doping concentration in diffusion-less annealing processes. This probe beam wavelength also provided excellent sensitivity to strain in strained silicon processes. More recently, the use of laser photo-reflectance technology for precision measurement of carrier diffusion lengths, recombination lifetimes, and mobilities has been demonstrated.

Spectroscopic vs. laser photo-reflectance
Spectroscopic photo-reflectance employs a broad band probe light source, which may cover wavelengths from the infrared to the ultraviolet. By fitting spectroscopic photo-reflectance data with the conventional third derivative functional form, a comprehensive set of interband transition energies, amplitudes, and widths may be obtained, providing an essentially complete characterization of the electronic properties of the sample of interest. However, owing to the need to keep the probe light intensity to a minimum and to the practical necessity of phase-locked detection, spectroscopic photo-reflectance measurements must be made sequentially, i.e. probe one wavelength at a time.  
This constraint limits the speed of spectroscopic photo-reflectance measurements, and coupled with the need for a careful fit procedure, renders spectroscopic photo-reflectance more suitable for analytical applications. Conversely, laser photo-reflectance employs a monochromatic light source, and hence is well suited for industrial applications. Moreover, in commonly encountered situations, the coherent wavefront of laser probe beam may be used to isolate the refractive component of the photo-reflectance signal, greatly simplifying the data analysis.

Advantages
 Photo-reflectance measures differential reflectivities as small as one part per million, whereas ellipsometry and/or standard reflectance measure differential reflectivities on the order of one part per thousand. 
 Photo-reflectance spectra exhibits sharp derivative-like structures localized at interband transition energies, whereas ellipsometry and/or standard reflectance exhibit broad slowly varying spectra. 
 The photo-reflectance response at a particular wavelength typically arises from specific interband transitions confined to specific materials within the sample. 
 By using phase-locked detection methods, ambient (nonsynchronous) light does not influence photo-reflectance measurements.
 By using a laser probe beam, the refractive part of the photo-reflectance response can be isolated without the necessity to take spectroscopic data or perform a fit procedure.
 Laser photo-reflectance has been proven in statistical process control for microelectronics manufacturing for over three decades.

See also 
 Spectroscopy
 Ellipsometry
 Photoluminescence
 Raman spectroscopy
 Surface photovoltage
 Terahertz time-domain spectroscopy

References

Further reading

Semiconductors and Semimetals, Vol. 9 ("Modulation Techniques"), edited by R.K Willardson and A.C. Beer, (Academic Press, New York, 1972). 
F.H. Pollack, "Modulation Spectroscopy of Semiconductors and Semiconductor Microstructures," in Handbook on Semiconductors, Vol. 2 ("Optical Properties of Semiconductors"), edited by M. Balkanski, pp. 527–635 (North-Holland, Amsterdam, 1994). 
A.M. Mansanares, "Optical Detection of Photothermal Phenomena in Operating Electronic Devices: Temperature and Defect Imaging," in Progress in Photothermal and Photoacoustic Science and Technology, Vol. 4 ("Semiconductors and Electronic Materials"), edited by A. Mandelis and P. Hess, pp. 73–108 (SPIE Press, Bellingham, WA, 2000). 

Optical metrology
Spectroscopy
Semiconductor analysis
Condensed matter physics